Christine Carpenter may refer to:

 Christine Carpenter (anchoress), medieval anchoress of Shere Church, Surrey
 Christine Carpenter (Hollyoaks), a character on the British soap opera Hollyoaks
 Christine Carpenter (historian) (born 1946), professor of medieval English history

See also
Chris Carpenter (disambiguation)